Events in the year 2020 in Sudan.

Incumbents 

 Chairman of the Sovereignty Council: Abdel Fattah al-Burhan
 Prime Minister: Abdalla Hamdok
 Deputy Chairman of the Sovereignty Council: Mohamed Hamdan Dagalo

Events 

Ongoing – War in Darfur

January
January 1 – Independence Day
January 7 – Coptic Christmas
January 14 – Revolution and Youth Day

February
February 9 – Sudanese leader Abdel Fattah Abdelrahman Burhan meets with Prime Minister Benjamin Netanyahu of Israel.  Former deputy Prime Minister Mubarak al Fadil al Mahdi of Sudan states that it would be good to normalize relations with Israel.
February 11 – The government of Sudan agrees that former president Omar al-Bashir will face war crime charges before the International Criminal Court (ICC), where he is accused of 300,000 deaths in Darfur.
February 13 – Sudan says it has reached a settlement in the USS Cole bombing, a first step in being removed from the designation as a state supporter of terrorism.

March
 March 13
 The country reports its first COVID-19 case in Khartoum, a man who died on 12 March 2020 and had visited the United Arab Emirates in the first week of March.
 Sudan stopped issuing visas for, and flights to, eight countries, including Italy and neighbouring Egypt, over fears of the coronavirus outbreak.

April
April 9 – Martyrs' Day
April 22 – Sudan reports 13 deaths and 140 confirmed cases of COVID-19, but there are fears that the actual number is much higher as people only go to the hospital when they are very sick. The government has increased its health budget by 200%, but $120 million to fight the new virus and $150 million to cover medicines until June is still needed. Importing equipment and medicine is difficult as suppliers prioritize their own countries.
April 29 – Representatives from the United Arab Emirates (UAE) visit Sudan to rally support and recruit fighters for Libya's Khalifa Haftar.
April 30 – Sudan criminalizes female genital mutilation.

May
May 6 – Fighting between Arabs and non-Arabs in South Darfur, Sudan, leaves thirty dead and a dozen wounded.
May 12 – Sudan pushes Ethiopia to resume discussion related to the $4.6 billion Grand Ethiopian Renaissance Dam on the Nile River that officials say will start filling in July.
May 13 – In the third incident of armed violence this month, 24 people, including paratroopers are killed in Kaduqli, Sudan.
May 23 – Sudan announces the formation of a special police force to prevent attacks on health workers. The country has reported at least 63 deaths from COVID-19 among around 3,380 confirmed cases of the coronavirus. There have been two dozen attacks on health workers over the past two months.

June
June 2 – Sudan appoints Maj. Gen. Yassin Ibrahim Yassin as its new Defense Minister.
June 9 – Sudanese militia leader Ali Kushayb, is arrested and charged with 50 crimes against humanity and war crimes in the War in Darfur.
June 26 – Egypt, Sudan, and Ethiopia agree to delay filling the Grand Ethiopian Renaissance Dam (GERD).

July
July 11 – Sudan institutes reforms allowing non-Muslims to drink alcohol in private and outlawing Female Genital Mutilation (FGM).
July 13 – Sudanese security forces violently break up a protest camp in North Darfur, killing at least protester and wounding a dozen others, including four children, activists.
July 24 
Mass graves likely tied to a 1990 coup attempt against former President Omar al-Bashir in Sudan are discovered.
2020 Darfur attacks - An attack on Aboudos in South Darfur left at least 20 people dead and another 22 were injured.
July : Gold hunters used heavy machinery to excavate the two millennia-old Jabal Maragha archaeological site in the Bayuda Desert, destroying it. The gold diggers were arrested and their equipment seized, but they were later released without charges in July 2020.

August
August 22 – Prime Minister Abdallá Hamdok announces that Sudan is willing to turn former dictator Omar al-Bashir over to the International Criminal Court.
August 30 – Ninety people die and hundreds of homes are destroyed in torrential rains.
August 31 – The transitional government and the Sudan Revolutionary Front initial a peace agreement in South Sudan.

September
Rain is expected to continue throughout the month. Some experts, such as International Rivers, expect climate change to cause periodic bouts of drought and flooding in the future. Authorities declare a three-month long state of emergency. 
September 8 – Flooding threatens the Pyramids of Meroë.
September 17 – Filmmaker Hajooj Kuka is among the five Sudanaese artists convicted on charges of public disturbance and violating public safety measures in Khartoum in a demonstration against dictator Omar al-Bashir in 2019. Six others are awaiting similar charges.

October
October 2 –  The United Nations Office for the Coordination of Humanitarian Affairs reports flooding has claimed more than 120 lives and left 860,000 people homeless. 
October 3 – The government of Sudan and ten rebel groups sign a peace agreement, ending 17 years of war.

 October 23 – Israel–Sudan normalization agreement

November
November 13 – The government declares amnesty for those who fought in the civil war, except for individuals charged with war crimes.

December
December 8 – Russia signs a agreement to use Port Sudan as a navy base on the Red Sea for 25 years.
December 9 – General Abdel Fattah al-Burhan says the transitional council has failed in its mission to bring about civilian rule.
December 15 – Sudan says that "Ethiopian forces and militias" ambushed Sudanese army forces near Jabal Abutiour, Sudan. Prime Minister Abdalla Hamdok visited Ethiopia briefly on December 13 to discuss the security situation.
December 23 – War in Darfur: The United Nations says it will withdraw its forces from Darfur on December 31, 2020. A peace agreement was signed in October of this year, but some groups, including Amnesty International, have called for an extension of the UNAMID mission.
December 27 – The government sends troops to South Darfur after ethnic fighting ends with 15 deaths in a dispute over water rights.

Deaths 
February 9 – Abdel Aziz El Mubarak, 69, singer; pneumonia.
March 25 – Jamal Aldin Omar, 60, Defence Minister.
September 8 – , 58, actress and singer.
November 26 – Sadiq al-Mahdi, 84, politician and religious leader, Prime Minister (1966–1967, 1986–1989); COVID-19.
December 21 – Bahaa el-Din Nouri, 45, electrician from Darfur; tortured to death.
December 27 – Abdel-Rahman Nour-el-Daem al-Tom, Sudanese politician, Governor of Blue Nile state, traffic collision.

See also

2020 in North Africa
COVID-19 pandemic in Africa
Grand Ethiopian Renaissance Dam
2020 Sudan floods

References 

2020 in Sudan
2020s in Sudan
Years of the 21st century in Sudan
Sudan
Sudan